Naldo Braidner Kwasie (born 20 April 1986) is a Surinamese footballer who plays as a defender for Inter Moengotapoe. He played for Suriname in 2014 FIFA World Cup qualifying.

International career

International goals
Scores and results list Suriname's goal tally first.

References 

1986 births
Living people
Association football defenders
Surinamese footballers
Sportspeople from Paramaribo
Suriname international footballers
SVB Eerste Divisie players
S.V. Transvaal players
Inter Moengotapoe players